Vuelta Ciclista Mexico Telmex was an annual road cycling race in Mexico that took place over the course of eight days, involving eight stages. The Mexico national tour had a rich history dating back to the 1940s, and the latest incarnation was revived in late 2008 and early 2009 as the condensed evolution of the Vueltas de las Americas, a 21-day stage race, defunct from 2003. This national tour was ranked 2.2, according to UCI race classifications, and was a part of the UCI America Tour. Title sponsorship was provided via CONADE (Comisión Nacional de Cultura Física y Deporte), as well as the Telmex Foundation, a philanthropic entity created by Telmex C.E.O., Carlos Slim.

History

2008 Vuelta a Mexico

With prizes of 2,000,000 Peso, worth roughly 188,000 (USD), the 2008 Vuelta a Mexico was held between September 13–20, and was centered primarily in the region north of Mexico City, commencing in Aguascalientes and concluded in the outskirts of Distrito Federal. Stage four was neutralized due to bad weather reducing the length of the Vuelta to 1,059 kilometers down from the scheduled 1,139. The final General Classification  was won by New Zealand racer, Glen Chadwick riding for team sponsor , which supports persons inflicted with Type 1 diabetes. Chadwick would return in 2009 to defend his title, albeit with rival sponsor .

2009 Vuelta a Mexico

In what was for all intents and purposes the "de facto" inaugural event, the revamped 2009 Vuelta Mexico Telmex was given a new date on the UCI America Tour calendar. This made it possible for American teams to join the race; the race was scheduled one week after the conclusion of February's Tour of California, and ended well before March's Redlands Bicycle Classic and April's Tour de Georgia. The Vuelta Mexico Telmex aimed to become the most significant stage race in Latin America, as a standard for Latin American teams, North American teams, and UCI Pro Continental teams seeking results and Grand Tour invite.

The 2009 Vuelta saw diverse North American presence, with first time participants including Rudy Pevenage directed, ; Steve Bauer directed, ; U.S. based  featuring Floyd Landis, all alongside the 2008 winning team . In addition,  U-23 Developmental Team, featuring Taylor Phinney started the race. The team was directed by Axel Merckx and partially owned by Lance Armstrong, who was on hand to fire the start signal for the 2009 race. During his trip to Vuelta Mexico, Armstrong stated that "a country the size of Mexico, with such diverse landscape needs to have a tour." With the primary devotion of fighting childhood cancer on behalf of his Lance Armstrong Foundation, Armstrong participated in various events with sponsors and the public, including a health care forum with Mexican President Felipe Calderon.

With prizes of 2.5 million Peso, worth roughly 163,000 (USD), the 2009 edition was held March 1–8, and was centered primarily among regional states located in the south-central part of Mexico. The race began in Oaxaca and passed through Puebla, Tlaxcala, Morelos, Edomex, Guanajuato, and Hildago before culminating in the center of Mexico City. The final stage, won by Canada's Andrew Pinfold, ended with a finish similar to that of the Tour de France as the 100+ kilometer circuit race completed twelve laps of the Angel of Independence along a large portion of the  Paseo de la Reforma (Reform Promenade). The extra wide boulevard, with its historically elegant design, sharply resembled Paris' Champs-Élysées. It stretched from Chapultepec Park, passing alongside Latin America's tallest building, the Torre Mayor, continuing through the Zona Rosa and then on to the Zócalo (Plaza de la Constitución). Among the largest central squares in the world, El Zócalo is bordered by the Mexico City Metropolitan Cathedral, National Palace, and is adjacent to the ancient Templo Mayor site. Ironically, Paseo de la Reforma, was modeled during the French occupation of the 1860s upon orders from Maximilian I with the dual purpose of linking Chapultepec Castle to the National Palace, while also creating a French legacy in the city centre.

Despite the presence of pre-race favorites Gilberto Simoni, Floyd Landis, Tyler Hamilton, Glen Chadwick, and Arquimedes Lam, the Final Overall General Classification was won by Venezuelan racer Jackson Rodríguez, of Venezuelan team sponsor . The Best Young Rider Classification, awarded to the highest place rider under the age of 23, was won by American Peter Stetina of the U.S. National Team. The combativity classification went to Karl Menzies, David Vitoria won the mountains classification, and Carlos López (Canels Turbo) won the Mexican rider classification.

2010 Vuelta a Mexico

The 2010 Vuelta Mexico Telmex was won by Óscar Sevilla, riding for the  team.

Jerseys
 Yellow = Overall Leader
 White = Best Mexican
 Red = Mountain Leader
 Green = Combativity Leader
 Blue = u23 Leader

Winners

Vuelta Mexico

Ruta Mexico

Vuelta Mexico Telmex

References

External links
 2008 Official Website Spanish
 2009 Official Website Spanish

 
Cycle races in Mexico
Recurring sporting events established in 2008
2008 establishments in Mexico
UCI America Tour races
Spring (season) events in Mexico